The American Cinema Editors (ACE) gives one or more Career Achievement Awards each year. The first awards were given in 1988.

List of honorees

2020s
2020: Alan Heim and Tina Hirsch

2010s
2019: Craig McKay and Jerrold L. Ludwig
2018: Mark Goldblatt and Leon Ortiz-Gil
2017: Janet Ashikaga and Thelma Schoonmaker
2016: Carol Littleton and Ted Rich
2015: Diane Adler and Gerald B. Greenberg 
2014: Richard Halsey and Robert C. Jones
2013: Richard Marks and Lawrence Silk
2012: Joel Cox and Doug Ibold
2011: Michael Kahn and Michael Brown
2010: Paul LaMastra and Neil Travis

2000s
2009: Sidney Katz and Arthur Schmidt
2008: Millie Moore and Bud S. Smith
2007: John Soh and Frank J. Urioste
2006: Edward M. Abroms and Terry Rawlings
2005: David Blewitt and Jim Clark
2004: Donn Cambern and John A. Martinelli
2003: John F. Burnett and Tom Rolf
2002: Antony Gibbs and George Watters
2001: Stanley Frazen and Fredric Steinkamp
2000: Dann Cahn and Marge Fowler

1990s
1999: John Bloom and Arthur Schneider
1998: Gerry Hambling and John Woodcock
1997: Fred W. Berger and Harry W. Gerstad
1996: Desmond Marquette and Aaron Stell
1995: David Bretherton and Anne V. Coates
1994: Dede Allen and Gene Ruggiero
1993: Rudi Fehr and Robert Swink
1992: Harold F. Kress and Charles Nelson
1991: William H. Reynolds and Ralph E. Winters
1990: Margaret Booth and Elmo Williams

1980s
1989: Warren Low and Dorothy Spencer
1988: Barbara McLean and Gene Milford

See also
Academy Award for Best Film Editing

External links and references 

American Cinema Editors Awards
Awards established in 1988
Lifetime achievement awards